Raag is an Estonian surname. Notable people with the surname include:

Andres Raag (born 1970), Estonian actor and singer
Ilmar Raag (born 1968), Estonian media executive, screenwriter, and film director
Kaljo Raag (1892–1967), Estonian weightlifter

Estonian-language surnames